9 Minster Gates is an historic building in the city of York, North Yorkshire, England. A Grade II listed building, located on Minster Gates at Minster Yard, the building dates to around 1755.

References

Houses in North Yorkshire
Buildings and structures in North Yorkshire
18th-century establishments in England
Grade II listed buildings in York
Grade II listed houses
18th century in York